Led Apple (stylized as LEDApple) was a South Korean rock band formed by Starkim Entertainment in 2010. The band's final lineup consisted of Seo Youngjun (Jun), Lee Kyumin (Kei) and Kim Hyoseok (AKi)

The part "Led" in LEDApple stood for "Logic Egoism Delete" and was promoted during their debut but they stopped referring to it since their CODA mini-album was released. Instead they replaced it with a practical explanation of "shining as brightly as LED whenever they perform" which was eventually referred to as a tribute to their role-model, Led Zeppelin. The word "Apple" in the band's name is supposed to represent their fresh image as idols and fresh music that they release. On August 16, 2015 it was announced that the band would be changing their name to LedT starting on September 1, 2015.

The band made their debut on October 6, 2010 with their promotional single, "Dash", a remake of Baek Ji-young's song of the same name. Since their debut, the band have released six singles and three mini-albums. The band disbanded March 6, 2016.

History

2010–2011: Debut and line-up changes
Prior to debut, member Minyong had been a contestant on the show Superstar K. The band was first revealed on September 27, 2010 as a five-member group and marketed as a new "idol rock band". The teaser for their debut single was released on September 29. On October 6, 2010, Led Apple performed their debut promotional single "Dash", which is a remake of a song originally sung by Baek Ji-young at the Busan International Film Festival and the music video was released the next day. The band's single was released alongside their single album, Logic Egoism Delete. They later performed the promotional single on November 11, 2010 on Mnet's M! Countdown as their debut stage.

On February 1, 2011, member I-OH announced his departure from the group on Twitter due to tuberculosis, however he did state that he would remain with the company. Vocalists of the group Minyong and Sunghyun later left due to personal reasons that were not publicly revealed. Three new members joined the band for the release of their mini-album, Niga Mwonde (lit. Who Do You Think You Are); Hyoseok, Jaehoon and Kyumin with Jaehoon becoming leader of the band. On June 13, 2011, the band released a comeback teaser for their mini-album and title track of the same name. However, the teaser was criticized for featuring the band in a club and drinking alcohol. Three members of Led Apple were minors at the time, and so the teaser was considered a bad influence towards youths.

The band's first mini-album, Niga Mwonde and lead single of the same name were released on June 15, 2011 alongside two different music videos; a regular version and a drama version. However, the band faced another controversy after many internet communities claimed that Led Apple's single "Niga Mwonde" had plagiarized CN Blue's song, "Love". However, Starkim Entertainment later released a statement addressing the plagiarism issue, stating that both songs were composed by Lee Sang-ho which is why they sounded similar. 

On July 19, 2011, Led Apple released their second promotional single from the mini-album Niga Mwonde, "Birthday Killer". The song was released in an attempt to make anti-fans realise that their hate comments can cause idols to do extreme things out of their misery. The music video was praised for being "powerful" in bringing out a message by critics and fans alike. However the song was not a commercial success and didn't manage to peak within the top one-hundred on the Gaon Chart.

After ending their promotions for the Niga Mwonde mini-album, leader Jaehoon left the band citing personal reasons; no other information was disclosed. On October 28, 2011, the band announced a new member would be joining them for their upcoming single, Keon U who is well known as the son of famous composer, Park Kwang-hyun. Another new member, Hanbyul was also announced on November 3 as the new appointed leader of the group alongside teaser photos of the rest of the band, thus making them a six-member group.

On November 7, the teaser for their next mini-album, CODA was released and it also revealed Led Apple's new sci-fi concept. An extended nine-minute version of the teaser was also released on November 9 and was dubbed the "drama teaser". The music video for their next single, "Eojjeoda Majuchin" (lit. Ran Into You By Chance) was released on November 11 and it featured former SeeYa member, Nam Gyu-ri as a cyborg and love interest in the video. In the week beginning December 2, the band's mini-album, CODA managed to reach an impressive number six on the Gaon Chart. On December 15, 2011, Led Apple was nominated for the "Anticipated Super Rookies for 2012" award at the Wave K Super Rookies Awards. The band managed to achieve the third highest number of votes for the award losing out to RaNia and B1A4, respectively.

2012–2014: K-Rookies Party, Vol. 1 and solo concerts
On January 29, 2012, Led Apple revealed a teaser for their newest single, "Time Is Up". It was later announced that Led Apple appointed the new leader of the band to be Youngjun. On February 2, the band made their comeback stage on Mnet's M! Countdown with their newest single, "Time Is Up" and the song was released the next day. The music video was released on February 6 and the single was heavily promoted on music shows. On February 12, it was announced that Led Apple would star in their own reality television show titled, Led Apple Entertainment where the six members have to start up and control their own fictional entertainment company whilst also having trainee singers join their company. The show began airing on February 15 and the final episode aired on March 21 on SBS MTV.

On March 5, Led Apple announced on their Facebook page that the band would cease their promotions for "Time Is Up" and be releasing a new digital single titled, "Sadness". Their single was released on March 9 and they also performed it on KBS's Music Bank as their comeback stage. On March 16, the band made their Japanese debut after attending the K-Rookies Party, Vol. 1 concert that took place in the Nakano Sun Plaza in Tokyo, Japan. The band performed four of their songs as part of the concert's finale and later expressed their desire to come back to Japan during the press conference. On March 26, Led Apple released the music video for "Sadness" and the song peaked at number 58 on the Gaon Chart.

After ending their promotions for "Sadness", the group announced that they would be holding their first solo concert titled, Now Playing – Led Apple in Seoul, Vol. 1. The concert took place on May 11, at the Soundholic City in Seoul. It also featured the band, Toxic, the winner of KBS2's Band Survival: TOP band as guest performers. Due to the success of their first solo concert, the band held two extra provincial concerts in Daegu and Busan on May 18 and 19, respectively. The group also announced their return to Japan with their second solo concert. Their second solo concert was held on June 23, at the Shinagawa Prince Stellar Ball in Tokyo, however Keon U was unable to perform alongside the group due to health problems.

On July 5, 2012, Led Apple released a music video for their song "Run To You" from their third mini-album "Run To You". The song is currently being promoted on music shows. Former member KeonU departed from the group due to health issues shortly after the song was released.

On October 5, 2012, Led apple had their "Now playing Led apple vol.2" concert at Hongdae, v-hall.

On November 15, 2012, Led apple released their single "Let The Wind Blow".

Led apple performed a 'Music Note' series on their official YouTube channel, where once a week they performed a cover. The profits that were made from the advertisements that appear when playing Music Note were donated to the international organisation that protect Children's Rights, "Save The Children". 50 'Music Note' videos were made in the time period from January 7, 2013, to December 31, 2013. Led apple has hinted that they would be continuing the series as soon as possible.

On June 16, 2013, Led apple released their third mini album "Bad Boys". A bit later, on July 31, they released a Japanese single "Gimme kimi love".

On November 3, 2013, a Korean digital single "With The Wind" and its music video was released, and on December 25, they released a Japanese album "The Greatest World".

On January 22, 2014, Led apple released a digital single "Left Alone". Later in the year, on March 20, they released the music video for the single "Who Are You". A bit later a Japanese version of it was also made.

2014–2016 Line-up changes and disbandment 
On October 28, 2014, not long after the celebration of LED Apple's 4th anniversary, it was confirmed that Hanbyul, Kyumin, and Kwangyeon would be leaving LED Apple. Hanbyul stated that his desire to pursue a solo career motivated his choice to leave the group, whilst Kyumin asserted that he wanted to launch himself into the Hip-Hop genre. Kwangyeon cited medical problems for leaving the group. The agency supported the decisions of Hanbyul, Kyumin, and Kwangyeon to leave.  A final performance with all of the members was held in December, 2014. In 2015, three new members joined LED Apple.

However, on January 1, 2015 the LEDApple official site stated that Kyumin would not leave the band. On January 5, 2015 Steroyal official Facebook announced 2 of LEDApple's new members, Hyunsang and Kyosung.

The information on LEDA JAPAN Facebook was edited as well:
"With the outstanding vocal, Hyeonsang at the centre of the group, vocal Kyumin, bassist Kyosong , guitarist Youngjun, and drummer Hyoseok form a five-members band. Along with the unique formation, their music perfectly mixes the basic band sound with guitar, drum, bass, and the trendy electronic sound to proudly demonstrate LEDApple’s unique music style. On top of this, by adding the superb dance performance that could not be found in the existing bands, they are gaining attention in and out of Korea with the unique concept of ‘Dance-Rock Band’ which lets the audience enjoy the stage with them”.

In 2016, the group disbanded.

2014: International Tour

European Tour

Japanese Tour

2nd European Tour

LEDApple 2014 The Last Live Tour 「ありがとね　LEDA」

Former members
 I-OH (이오)
 Sunghyun (성현)
 Minyong (민용)
 Jaehoon (재훈)
 Keon U (건우)
 Hanbyul (한별)
 Kwangyeon (광연)
 Kyo (교)
 JUN 준)
 AKi (아키)
 Kei (케이)

Timeline

Discography

Extended plays

Single albums

Singles

Soundtrack appearances
 2012: "Smile Again" - Lovers of Haeundae OST
 2013: "Going to You" - Bel Ami OST
 2014: "Call My Name" - Marriage, Not Dating OST

Tours and concerts

Main concerts
Now Playing – Led Apple in Seoul, Vol. 1 (2012)
LEDApple 1st Concert in Japan (2012)
LEDApple World Tour Concert (2014) - Japan, Netherlands, Romania, Germany, Italy, Greece
Hot Summer with (2014) - Tokyo, Osaka
Hot Summer in (2014) - France, Germany, Poland
LEDApple Mini Tour in Europe (2014) - Austria, Russia, Finland
LEDApple 2014 The Last Live Tour 「ありがとね　LEDA (Thank you, LEDA)」 (2014) - Shibuya, Osaka, Tokyo

Guest participation
K-Rookies Party, Vol. 1 (2012)

Awards and nominations

Notes

References

K-pop music groups
Musical groups established in 2010
Musical groups disestablished in 2016
South Korean boy bands
South Korean dance music groups
South Korean pop rock music groups
2010 establishments in South Korea
Musical groups from Seoul